Muriel Leroy (born 7 July 1968 at Ermont) is a former French athlete,  who specialised in the  sprints and the Long jump.

Biography  
She won four French championship titles: the outdoor Long jump in 1991, and three indoor titles (the 200m in 1992 and the long jump in 1988 and 1989).

In 1987 she reached the final of the 4 × 100m relay in the Rome World Championships, taking the eighth and final race. She participated in the 1988 Olympics in Seoul and took seventh in the 4 × 100m relay alongside Françoise Leroux,  Laurence Bily and Patricia Girard.

Prize list  
 French Championships in Athletics:  
 winner of the long jump 1991   
 French Indoor Athletics Championships :  
 winner of the 200 m in 1992   
 winner of the long jump in 1988 and 1989

Records

notes and references

External links  
  Docathlé2003, French Athletics Federation, 2003, p. 416   
   Olympic profile: Muriel Leroy on sports-reference.com

Living people
1968 births
People from Ermont
French female long jumpers
French female sprinters
Olympic athletes of France
Athletes (track and field) at the 1988 Summer Olympics
Sportspeople from Val-d'Oise